John Smylie may refer to:
 John Sheridan Smylie, American Episcopal bishop
 John A. Smylie, member of the Mississippi House of Representatives